Net game may refer to:

 Online game
 Net and wall games